Sandy Ferguson may refer to:

 Sandy Ferguson (1879–1919), Canadian boxer.
 Sandy Ferguson (footballer) (1867–1894), Scottish football player

See also
Alexander Ferguson (disambiguation)
Alex Ferguson (disambiguation)